The post of Mayor of Kópavogur was created in 1955.

List of mayors

References
kopavogur.is - Bæjarstjórar í Kópavogi

Kopavogur